Grendel is a 1971 novel by the American author John Gardner. It is a retelling of part of the Old English poem Beowulf from the perspective of the antagonist, Grendel. In the novel, Grendel is portrayed as an antihero. The novel deals with finding meaning in the world, the power of literature and myth, and the nature of good and evil.

In a 1973 interview, Gardner said, "In Grendel I wanted to go through the main ideas of Western civilization – which seemed to me to be about ... twelve? – and go through them in the voice of the monster, with the story already taken care of, with the various philosophical attitudes (though with Sartre in particular), and see what I could do, see if I could break out." On another occasion, he noted that he "us[ed] Grendel to represent Sartre's philosophical position" and that "a lot of Grendel is borrowed from sections of Sartre's Being and Nothingness".

Grendel has become one of Gardner's best-known and best-reviewed works. Several editions of the novel contain pen and ink line drawings of Grendel's head, by Emil Antonucci. Ten years after publication, the novel was adapted into the 1981 animated film Grendel Grendel Grendel.

Background
The basic plot derives from Beowulf, a heroic poem of unknown authorship written in Old English and preserved in a manuscript dating from around AD 1000. The poem deals with the heroic exploits of the Geat warrior Beowulf, who battles three antagonists: Grendel, Grendel's mother and, later in life, an unnamed dragon. Gardner's retelling, however, presents the story from the existentialist view of Grendel, exploring the history of the characters before Beowulf arrives. Beowulf himself plays a relatively small role in the novel, but he is still the only human hero that can match and kill Grendel. The dragon plays a minor part as an omniscient and bored character, whose wisdom is limited to telling Grendel "to seek out gold and sit on it"; his one action in the novel is to endow Grendel with the magic ability to withstand attacks by sword (a quality Gardner found in the original).

Gardner himself explained that his Grendel character is modeled on Jean-Paul Sartre, with whom Gardner claimed to have a love-hate relationship: "He's a horror intellectually, figuratively, and morally, but he's a wonderful writer and anything he says you believe, at least for the moment, because of the way he says it ... What happened in Grendel was that I got the idea of presenting the Beowulf monster as Jean-Paul Sartre, and everything that Grendel says Sartre in one mood or another has said."

Plot

In the opening scene, Grendel briefly fights with a ram when frustrated with its stupidity. He then mockingly asks the sky why animals lack sense and dignity; the sky does not reply, adding to his frustration. Grendel then passes through his cave and encounters his mute mother before venturing out into the night where he attacks Hrothgar's mead hall, called "Hart" in Grendel. Later, Grendel reminisces about his early experiences in life, beginning with his childhood days of exploring the caves inhabited by him, his mother and other creatures with which he is unable to speak. One day, however, he arrives at a pool filled with firesnakes, which he enters.  Upon exiting, he eventually becomes wedged and trapped in a tree. Helpless, he eventually falls asleep, only to wake surrounded by humans.  Although Grendel can understand the humans, they cannot understand him and they become frightened, which leads to a fight between Grendel and the Danish warriors, including Hrothgar. Grendel is barely saved from death at the hands of the humans by the appearance of his mother.

During Hrothgar's rise to prominence, a blind poet appears at the doors of Hart, whom Grendel calls "the Shaper". He tells the story of the ancient warrior Scyld Shefing, which enraptures and seduces Grendel. The monster reacts violently to the power the beautiful myth has on him and flees. Grendel continues to be enraptured by the tales. After seeing a corpse and two lovers juxtaposed, he drags the corpse to Hart, bursting into the hall and begging for mercy and peace. The thegns do not comprehend his actions and see this as an attack, driving him from the hall. While fleeing the men, he curses them, yet still returns later to hear the rest of the Shaper's songs, half enraptured and half enraged.

When Grendel returns to his cave, he attempts and fails to communicate with his mother, thus leaving him with a sense of total loneliness. He becomes filled with despair and falls through the sea, finding himself in an enormous cave filled with riches and a dragon. The omniscient dragon reveals to Grendel that the power of the Shaper is simply the ability to make the logic of humans seem real, despite the fact his lore possesses no factual basis. The dragon and Grendel cannot agree about the dragon's statements that existence is a chain reaction of accidents, and Grendel exits the cave in a mixed state of confusion, anger, and denial.

While listening to the Shaper, he is spotted by sentries, who try to fight him off again, but he discovers that the dragon has enchanted him, leaving him impervious to weapons. Realizing his power, he begins attacking Hart, viewing his attacks as a perpetual battle. Grendel is challenged by a thane named Unferth, to which he responds mockingly. Grendel awakens a few days later to realize that Unferth has followed him to his cave in an act of heroic desperation. He continues to mock Unferth until the Dane passes out from exhaustion, then takes him back to Hart to live out his days in frustrated mediocrity, stopping him from having a heroic death.

In the second year of the war, Grendel notes that his raids have destroyed the esteem of Hrothgar, allowing a rival noble named Hygmod to gain power. Fearing deposition, Hrothgar assembles an army to attack Hygmod and his people, the Helmings. Instead of a fight, Hygmod offers his sister Wealtheow to Hrothgar as a wife after a series of negotiations. The beauty of Wealtheow moves Grendel as the Shaper had once before, keeping the monster from attacking Hart just as she prevents internal conflicts among the Danes. Eventually, Grendel decides to kill Wealtheow, since she threatens the ideas explained by the dragon. Upon capturing her, he realizes that killing and not killing are equally meaningless, and he retreats, knowing that by not killing Wealtheow, he has once again confounded the logic of humanity and religion.

Later, Grendel watches as Hrothgar's nephew Hrothulf develops his understanding of the two classes in Danish society: thegns and peasants, then further explores them with a peasant named Red Horse, who teaches Hrothulf that government exists only for the protection of those in power.

Grendel watches a religious ceremony and is approached by an old priest named Ork, who thinks that Grendel is their main deity, the Destroyer, and engages him in conversation. When three other priests approach and chastise Ork, Grendel flees, overwhelmed with a vague dread.

Watching the Danes, Grendel hears a woman predict the coming of an illustrious thegn and then witnesses the death of the Shaper. Returning to his cave, his mother seems agitated. She manages to make one unusual unintelligible word, which Grendel discounts, and then goes to the Shaper's funeral. Later, in the cave, he wakes up with his mother still making word-like noises, and once again feels a terrible foreboding.

Grendel reveals that fifteen travellers have come to Denmark from over the sea, almost as though the way was set before them. The visitors, who reveal themselves to be Geats ruled by Hygelac, have an uneasy relationship with the Danes. Upon their arrival, Grendel notices the firm nature of their leader, Beowulf, and the fact that his lips do not move in accordance with his words, and sees a great lust for violence in Beowulf's eyes, convincing Grendel he is insane.

At nightfall, Grendel attacks. When he believes that all the men are asleep, he breaks into the hall and eats one man. Grabbing the wrist of another, he realizes that it is an alert Beowulf, and that he has grabbed his arm. They wrestle furiously, during which Beowulf appears to become a flaming, dragon-like figure and repeats many of the ideas that the dragon revealed to Grendel. The Geat slams Grendel into the walls of the hall, then rips off Grendel's arm, causing the monster to flee in pain and fear. Grendel proceeds to toss himself into an abyss (whether or not Grendel jumps is left up to the perception of the reader), and dies wondering if what he is feeling is joy, understanding what the dragon meant by the accident statement, and cursing existence.

Characters  
Gardner includes all featured characters from the original poem in his novel, but greatly changes many roles. Beowulf himself, for example, appears only in the last portion of the novel and has little dialogue or interaction with other characters. The author also introduces a handful of incidental minor characters.

Grendel –  the main protagonist and self-described monster, given the narrator's voice in the novel.
Grendel's mother –  another antagonist from Beowulf who lives in an underwater cave with her son. Unlike her son, she is incapable of speech and holds no curiosity of the world outside her cave.
Beowulf  –  a Geatish hero who ultimately kills Grendel. He is never referred to by name in the novel. He is given qualities similar to the dragon.
Hrothgar –  warrior and king of the Danes.
The Shaper  – a blind harpist and storyteller in Hrothgar's court. He creates the Dane's image of Grendel as a threat by telling fictional stories.
The Shaper's assistant  – the young apprentice who replaces the Shaper upon his death.
Unferth –  a Scylding warrior who challenges but fails to defeat Grendel.
Wealtheow  – queen of the Danes and wife to Hrothgar.
Hrothulf – Hrothgar's orphaned nephew.
Freawaru –  Hrothgar's teenage daughter.
Hygmod – King of the Helmings and Wealtheow's brother.
The dragon  – an ancient, omniscient beast guarding a vast hoard of treasure to whom Grendel goes for advice. It possibly is a figment of Grendel's imagination. It is also possible the dragon was meant to be the same dragon that appeared in the epic  poem Beowulf as he does reference how he has foreseen his own death at the hands of a human, he also alludes that his death would be the end of his kind implying that he is the last dragon.
Red Horse – Hrothulf's elderly advisor.
Ork – an old and blind Scylding priest.

Portrayal of Grendel
The Pulitzer Prize winning author Jane Smiley suggests that Gardner uses Grendel as a metaphor for the necessity for a dark side to everything; where a hero is only as great as the villain he faces. Using Grendel's perspective to tell at least part of the story of Beowulf in more contemporary language allows the story to be seen in a new light not only in terms of the point of view but also brings it into the modern era.

Where Grendel is portrayed mainly as a physical creature in the original work, here a glimpse into his psyche is offered. Grendel lives in isolation and loneliness with his mother, who in her old age is unable to provide any real companionship to her child. As the only being of his kind, he has no one to relate to and feels the need to be understood or have some connection. Grendel has a complex relationship with the humans who hate and fear him. He feels that he is somehow related to humanity and despite his desire to eat them, he can be moved by them and their works. His long life grants him the ability to act as a witness to how their lives transpire and their behavior and logic bewilders him. He is cursed to a life of solitude, also being portrayed as having eternal life, which furthers his plight and loneliness as he can only fall in battle and he is immune to all human weapons. He is only freed from his tormented life through his encounter with Beowulf.

Film adaptations

An Australian-produced animated movie, Grendel Grendel Grendel, based on Gardner's novel, was released in 1981, in limited quantities on VHS. The film features the voice of Peter Ustinov as Grendel and, like the novel, is related from Grendel's point of view. It is animated, in color, and runs roughly 90 minutes. In 2004, the soundtrack to the film, by Bruce Smeaton, was released on the 1M1 Records label.

Reception

D. Keith Mano praised Grendel lavishly in The New York Times Book Review, writing, "John Gardner's Grendel is myth itself: permeated with revelation, with dark instincts, with swimming, riotous universals. The special profundity of Gardner's vision or visions is so thought-fertile that it shunts even his fine poet's prose to a second importance". Another Times reviewer, Richard Locke, declared the novel "an extraordinary achievement – very funny, original and deft, altogether lovable, poignant, rich with thought and feeling". Kirkus Reviews also reviewed Grendel favorably, saying, "Gardner demonstrates his agility at juggling metaphysical notions while telling a diverting tale."

The book was nominated for the 1972 Mythopoeic Award for best novel.

It was given special mention by Diana Athill in her memoir Stet, covering her decades as an editor with UK publisher André Deutsch. "Having to read Beowulf almost turned me against Oxford, so when a New York agent offered me this novel I could hardly bring myself to open it. If I hadn't, I would have missed a great pleasure – a really powerful feat of imagination."

Musical adaptations

Rock
In 1982, the British neo-progressive rock band Marillion recorded a 17-minute opus entitled "Grendel" that was based on the book. The song was initially released as a B-side to the 12-inch version of their first single, "Market Square Heroes" (now out of print). The song was also released on the compilation album B'Sides Themselves and the two-disc remastered version of their first album, Script for a Jester's Tear.

The American alternative rock band Sunny Day Real Estate recorded a song called "Grendel" that was based on the book and appeared on its 1994 first album, Diary.

Opera

On June 8, 2006, an opera based on the novel was premiered at the Los Angeles Opera. The score was composed by Elliot Goldenthal, with a libretto by Julie Taymor and J. D. McClatchy. Taymor also directed the piece. The part of Grendel was sung by the bass-baritone Eric Owens, the dragon by the mezzo-soprano Denyce Graves, the Shaper by the tenor Richard Croft, Wealtheow by the soprano Laura Claycomb and Unferth by the tenor Jay Hunter Morris. Beowulf, a dancing role, was performed by Desmond Richardson. The opera was produced in New York City during summer 2006 at the New York State Theater as part of the Lincoln Center Festival.

Explanatory notes

Citations

General and cited sources

External links

 
 An Index to John Gardner's Grendel

1971 American novels
1971 fantasy novels
Alfred A. Knopf books
American fantasy novels adapted into films
American philosophical novels
Novels based on Beowulf
Novels by John Gardner (American writer)
Novels set in the Dark Ages
Parallel literature